"Wasting Love" is a song by the English heavy metal band Iron Maiden. It is the third single from their ninth studio album, Fear of the Dark, released in 1992.

Synopsis
The song was a collaboration of singer Bruce Dickinson, and guitarist Janick Gers. The lyrics deal with the subject of loneliness brought on by sex outside the context of love.

The single was only officially released in the Netherlands, although different one-track promotional CDs exist, one for U.S. radio stations and another for Spain, which had the only vinyl version of the single.

The single cover is the third Iron Maiden single not to feature the band's iconic mascot Eddie on the front cover (the previous examples being "Running Free (live)" and "From Here to Eternity"). The cover photo alludes to the music video, which portrays a man tattooing the names of women all over his body. The song's video was directed by Samuel Bayer.

The guitar solo in "Wasting Love" is played by Janick Gers.

B-sides
The B-side features three live tracks recorded at London's Wembley Arena on the "No Prayer On The Road" tour to support the No Prayer for the Dying album in 1990. These live recordings of "Tailgunner", "Holy Smoke" and "The Assassin" are also available on a very rare Australian digi-pack (CD) version of the Fear of the Dark album that was released to promote the Australian leg of the tour in 1992.

Track listing 

CD-Maxi Single

7" Canada Single

Personnel
Bruce Dickinson – vocals
Dave Murray – rhythm guitar
Janick Gers – lead guitar
Steve Harris – bass guitar
Nicko McBrain – drums

References

 
 Covered by 80 Rock Tribute Group - Son of Jorel's Tribute to 80s Rock (2003)

Iron Maiden songs
1992 songs
1992 singles
Songs written by Bruce Dickinson
Songs written by Janick Gers
Music videos directed by Samuel Bayer
EMI Records singles
Heavy metal ballads